Jack Middelburg (30 April 1952 – 3 April 1984) was a Dutch professional Grand Prix motorcycle road racer. Together with Wil Hartog and Boet van Dulmen, he was part of a contingent of Dutch riders who competed at the highest levels of Grand Prix racing in the late 1970s. Middelburg never earned a factory-sponsored race bike, yet managed to post some impressive results.

Motorcycling career

Middelburg became the second Dutchman to win the Dutch TT in 1980, and in 1981 he pulled off an unexpected upset when he defeated the defending world champion, Kenny Roberts at the British Grand Prix at Silverstone. His best years were in 1979 and 1981, when he finished in seventh place in the 500cc world championships. Middelburg was the last privateer to win a motorcycle Grand Prix in the 500cc class.

Middelburg was killed while competing in a street circuit race in Tolbert,  Netherlands in 1984. On 2 April, he lost control of his motorcycle, and was run over by Boet van Dulmen. He was rushed to hospital, and died a day later.

Career statistics

Grand Prix motorcycle racing

Races by year
(key) (Races in bold indicate pole position) (Races in italics indicate fastest lap)

References

1952 births
1984 deaths
Dutch motorcycle racers
500cc World Championship riders
350cc World Championship riders
People from Naaldwijk
Motorcycle racers who died while racing
Sport deaths in the Netherlands
Sportspeople from South Holland
20th-century Dutch people